Acmanthina is a genus of moths belonging to the family Tortricidae and tribe Euliini. Within Euliini, it is part of the Bonagota group of closely related genera, alongside Apotomops, Bonagota, Haemateulia and Ptychocroca.

The name of the genus is derived from the specific epithet of its type species, Acmanthina acmanthes.

Species
Acmanthina acmanthes (Meyrick, 1931)
Acmanthina albipuncta  Brown, 2000
Acmanthina molinana Razowski & Pelz, 2010

Notes and references

 , 2005, World Catalogue of Insects 5
  2010: Tortricidae from Chile (Lepidoptera: Tortricidae). Shilap Revista de Lepidopterologia 38 (149): 5-55.

External links

tortricidae.com

Euliini
Tortricidae genera